The E-mu SP-1200 is a sampler created by Dave Rossum that was released in August 1987 by E-mu Systems.

Like the product it was meant to replace, the SP-12, the SP-1200's intended use was as a drum machine and sequencer for dance music producers. However, its use as a phrase sampler produces a "gritty" sound due to the machine's 26.04 kHz sampling rate, its SSM2044 filter chips and its 12-bit sampling resolution. This distinctive sound, often said to capture the "warmth" of vinyl recordings (because both formats attenuate significant amounts of bass and treble), has sustained demand for the SP-1200 more than thirty years after its discontinuation, despite the introduction of digital audio workstations and samplers/sequencers with far superior technical specifications, such as the Akai MPC.

The SP-1200 is strongly associated with hip hop's golden age. Its ability to construct the bulk of a song within one piece of portable gear, a first for the industry, reduced studio costs and increased creative control for hip-hop artists. According to the Village Voice, "The machine rose to such prominence that its strengths and weaknesses sculpted an entire era of music: the crunchy digitized drums, choppy segmented samples, and murky filtered basslines that characterize the vintage New York sound are all mechanisms of the machine."

Features
The SP-1200 can store up to 100 patterns, 100 songs, and has a 5,000-note maximum memory for drum sequences. It also has a mono mix output and eight individual outputs, MIDI in/out/through, SMPTE sync, and a metronome output. Selecting between memory banks A, B, C, and D gives the user easy access to each of the 32 sounds. The front panel contains eight volume and pitch faders for each sound in the selected bank. Below each fader is a large button to initialize the sound, or select the sound for editing, and a switch to turn the trigger's velocity sensitivity off or on. The sequencer works in the familiar pattern-style of placing short consecutive sections of samples into a song. The user can easily add swing quantization and tempo changes. The sequencer can sync the tempo to SMPTE, MIDI, or analogue clock pulses and is also capable of synchronizing the tempo to a tapping finger with the tap-tempo button."

Differences from the SP-12 
Unlike the SP-12, the SP-1200 does not contain ROM-based samples; all samples are stored in volatile RAM and loaded from floppy disk.  The AD/DA converters remain 12 bit, as 16 bit converters were still expensive and found only on high-end gear, such as the contemporary E-Mu Emulator 3, which had a list price of over $15,000 USD.  Maximum sampling time was doubled from the upgraded SP-12 Turbo, to over 10 seconds, but the maximum single sample was 2.5 seconds. It has been erroneously published and rumored that the SP-12 had a slightly higher sampling frequency (27.5 kHz) but this is incorrect. The SP-1200 sample rate remained the same as the SP-12 (26.04 kHz).  The SP-1200 retained all of the I/O capabilities from the SP-12, minus the cassette output and 1541 Commodore Computer floppy disk I/O.

Technique
The limited sampling time of the SP-1200 was overcome within the late 1980s hip hop production circles by sampling 33⅓ rpm records at 45 rpm, with an additional pitch increase, then replaying the sample from the SP-1200 at a much slower speed (by the use of Multipitch and/or tune/decay edit functions). This expanded the total sampling time while at the same time decreasing the resolution. By the early 1990s, nearly every working hip hop producer had adopted this technique as industry standard until the advent of newer samplers such as Akai's MPC60, which provided higher sampling rates and more sampling time.

Reissue

In 2021, Dave Rossum announced that he would be reissuing the SP-1200 through his company, Rossum Electro-Music. The Rossum SP-1200 contains 20 seconds of sample time, double that of the original's 10 seconds.

See also 
Amen break
Ultimate Breaks and Beats
AKAI S950
Music Production Center

References

Samplers (musical instrument)
Hip hop production